The 2019 Danish Individual Speedway Championship was the 2019 edition of the Danish Individual Speedway Championship. As in 2018, the final was staged over a single round at the Holsted Speedway Center. Kenneth Bjerre won his second national title, having previously triumphed in 2010. Seven-time champion Niels Kristian Iversen finished second, with Rasmus Jensen third and Bjarne Pedersen fourth.

Event format 
Each rider competed in five rides, with the four top scorers racing in an additional heat. The points from the additional heat were then added to the previous score from the five riders. The winner was the rider who accumulated the most points in all of their rides, and not the rider who won the additional heat.

Final 

{| width=100%
|width=50% valign=top|
30 May 2019
 Holsted

References 

Denmark
Speedway in Denmark
2019 in Danish motorsport